In Greek mythology, Electryone (Ancient Greek: Ἠλεκτρυώνην) or Alectrona (Doric form) was a daughter of Helios and Rhodos, and sister to the Heliadae. She died a virgin and was worshipped as a heroine on the island of Rhodes.

She was possibly a goddess of the sunrise, or of man's waking sense. The Doric form of her name is akin to the Greek word for "rooster" (Alectrona, the feminine genitive of Αλεκτορ, Alektor, the ancient Greek word for "rooster"), while the Attic form Electryone is akin to the word for "amber" (Ἠλέκτρα, Elektra), as in the amber color of sunrise.

A marble tablet from the 3rd century BC found in Ialyssus contains an inscription about the regulations for visitors to the temple of Alectrona.

Genealogy

Notes

References
 Diodorus Siculus, The Library of History translated by Charles Henry Oldfather. Twelve volumes. Loeb Classical Library. Cambridge, Massachusetts: Harvard University Press; London: William Heinemann, Ltd. 1989. Vol. 3. Books 4.59–8. Online version at Bill Thayer's Web Site
 Diodorus Siculus, Bibliotheca Historica. Vol 1-2. Immanel Bekker. Ludwig Dindorf. Friedrich Vogel. in aedibus B. G. Teubneri. Leipzig. 1888-1890. Greek text available at the Perseus Digital Library.
 Graves, Robert; The Greek Myths, Penguin Books Ltd. (1960 edition). 42. c, 4.
 Numismatic Chronicle, Volume 18
 Smith, William; Dictionary of Greek and Roman Biography and Mythology, London (1873). "Electryo'ne" 

Greek virgin goddesses
Greek mythological heroes
Children of Helios
Demigods in classical mythology
Rhodian characters in Greek mythology